André Filippini (13 September 1924 – 19 November 2013) was a Swiss bobsledder who competed in the early 1950s. He won a bronze medal in the four-man event at the 1952 Winter Olympics in Oslo.

Filippini was also a businessman and was at the center of the Savro Affair, a financial and political scandal in the late 1970s.

He was president of FC Sion from 1971 to 1977.

References

1924 births
2013 deaths
Bobsledders at the 1952 Winter Olympics
Olympic bobsledders of Switzerland
Olympic bronze medalists for Switzerland
Swiss male bobsledders
Olympic medalists in bobsleigh
Medalists at the 1952 Winter Olympics
Swiss businesspeople
FC Sion
Swiss football chairmen and investors
20th-century Swiss people